Werner Heyn (born 24 May 1934) is a German former sports shooter. He competed in the 50 metre rifle, prone event at the 1968 Summer Olympics for East Germany.

References

External links
 

1934 births
Living people
German male sport shooters
Olympic shooters of East Germany
Shooters at the 1968 Summer Olympics
People from Zwickau
Sportspeople from Saxony